Light Up the Night may refer to:

Music

Albums
 Light Up the Night (The Brothers Johnson album), 1980
 Light Up the Night (Jess Moskaluke album), 2014
 Light Up the Night, an album by Mike Stevens

Songs
 "Light Up the Night" (Boyzone song), 2014
 "Light Up the Night", a song by The Black Eyed Peas from The Beginning
 "Light Up the Night", a song by The Protomen from Act II: The Father of Death
 "Light Up the Night", a song by Warr Acres from Hope Will Rise
 "Light Up the Night", a song by The Besnard Lakes from The Besnard Lakes Are the Roaring Night
 "Light Up the Night", a song by Symphony X from Iconoclast
 "Light Up the Night", a song by Recover from This May Be the Year I Disappear